The Edwin Bassett House is a historic house in Reading, Massachusetts.  It is a well-preserved Greek Revival house, built in 1850 by Edwin Bassett, the first Reading shoemaker to install a McKay stitching machine, a device that revolutionized and led to the industrialization of what was before that a cottage industry.  The house was listed on the National Register of Historic Places in 1984.

Description and history
The Bassett House is set on the north side of Prescott Street, a residential through street to the west of Reading's central business district.  Facing south, it is a -story wood-frame structure, three bays wide, with a front-gable roof and clapboard siding.  Its Greek Revival features include corner pilasters and a wide frieze that encircles the house, and a fully pedimented gable, which is not usually found on period houses in Reading.  A single-story hip-roofed porch extends across the front facade, supported by Doric columns.  The house follows a typical side hall plan; its entry is flanked by flat pilasters.

Prescott Street was laid out in 1845 on what had previously been farmland.  This house was built in 1850 by Edwin Bassett, a maker of shoes for children and infants, a common product for local shoemakers in what was then a cottage industry.  Bassett was the first in Reading to install a McKay stitching machine, significantly improving the process by which shoes were made.  The machine had a revolutionizing effect in Reading, where the process of shoemaking would become increasingly industrialized.

See also
National Register of Historic Places listings in Reading, Massachusetts
National Register of Historic Places listings in Middlesex County, Massachusetts

References

Houses on the National Register of Historic Places in Reading, Massachusetts
Houses in Reading, Massachusetts